Jawbreaker is a Canadian English language television talk show hosted by Brad Fraser. The program features guests who discuss and debate varying topics and issues predominantly relating to the LGBT community. Jawbreaker premiered on October 11, 2002 at 10:00 p.m. EST on the Canadian specialty channel PrideVision TV, now called OUTtv.

References

External links
 

2000s Canadian television talk shows
OutTV (Canadian TV channel) original programming
2002 Canadian television series debuts
2004 Canadian television series endings
2000s Canadian LGBT-related television series